The Cascade Mountains leeward forests are a temperate coniferous forest ecoregion of North America, as defined by the World Wildlife Fund (WWF) categorization system.

Setting
This is a band of mountain habitat running north–south along the leeward side of the Cascade Mountains in British Columbia, Canada and Washington, United States, with the Okanagan Highland to the south on the US-Canada border and the Chilcotin Ranges to the north.

This is a varied mountain landscape of rugged, snowy peaks, glaciers and alpine meadows.

Flora
Higher elevation subalpine slopes are home to Engelmann spruce (Picea engelmannii), subalpine fir (Abies lasiocarpa) and lodgepole pine (Pinus contorta) while lower montane forests consist of lodgepole pine, quaking aspen (Populus tremuloides), white spruce (Picea glauca) and Rocky Mountain Douglas-fir.

Fauna
Wildlife of the mountains includes bighorn sheep (Ovis canadensis), mountain goat (Oreamnos americanus), grizzly bear (Ursus arctos) and black bear (Ursus americanus), black-tailed deer (Odocoileus hemionus), coyote (Canis latrans) and cougar (Puma concolor couguar) with smaller mammals such as the northern flying squirrel. The birds include spotted owl, dusky grouse (Dendragapus obscurus) and a number of birds of prey. The Fraser River is particularly important for salmon and also acts as a barrier to the movement of wildlife within the region.

Threats and preservation
Most of this forest is still intact although threatened by logging, mining and other human intervention. Large blocks of intact forest include North Cascades National Park in Washington and the following areas of British Columbia; Big Creek Provincial Park and Spruce Lake Protected Area, the Stein Valley Nlaka'pamux Heritage Park, E. C. Manning Provincial Park, Tsʼilʔos Provincial Park, Cathedral Provincial Park and Protected Area, Skagit Valley Provincial Park, Marble Range Provincial Park, Cascade Recreation Area and Edge Hills Provincial Park near Fraser Canyon.

See also
List of ecoregions in Canada (WWF)
List of ecoregions in the United States (WWF)

References

External links

North Cascades
Temperate coniferous forests
Temperate coniferous forests of the United States
Ecoregions of the United States
Ecozones and ecoregions of British Columbia

Forests of British Columbia
Forests of Washington (state)
Montane forests
Natural history of British Columbia
Natural history of Washington (state)

Plant communities of the West Coast of the United States
Nearctic ecoregions